The Tudor House is an 18th-century house in Langport, Somerset, England.

It was built in 1776 but had fallen into disrepair until it was bought and restored by the Somerset Buildings Preservation Trust in 1991 and is now a Grade II listed building.

References

External links 
 Tudor House, Langport from Somerset Buildings Preservation Trust

Country houses in Somerset
Houses completed in 1776
Grade II listed buildings in South Somerset
Langport